Urjala (also ) is a municipality of Finland. It is part of the Pirkanmaa region, near the town of Forssa.

Neighbouring municipalities are Akaa, Forssa, Humppila, Hämeenlinna, Punkalaidun, Sastamala, Tammela, and Vesilahti.

The municipality is unilingually Finnish.

The oldest glassblowing factory in Finland is located in the village of Nuutajärvi, Urjala.

Villages 

 Annula
 Hakkila
 Hakolahti, Halkivaha
 Harittu
 Honkola
 Huhti
 Kamppari
 Kehro
 Kokko
 Kolunkulma
 Laukeela
 Menonen
 Nuutajärvi
 Perho
 Puolimatka
 Salmi
 Tursa
 Urjalankylä
 Vahonen
 Valajärvi
 Velkala
 Välkkilä

Notable individuals 
Johan Hampus Furuhjelm, vice-admiral and explorer
Mimmi Kanervo, one of Finland's first female MPs
Väinö Linna, author (born in Urjala, although he is most often referred to be from Tampere where he lived most of his adult life)
Arvo Lehto, municipal manager for 32 years (1948-1980)

Images

References

External links

Municipality of Urjala – Official website
Urjalafoorumi – A discussion forum concerning Urjala

 
Populated places established in 1868